Red Bus may refer to:

Red Bus Diary, book
Red Bus (Mendoza), smart card in Argentina
Red Bus (New Zealand), bus operator in Christchurch
Red Bus Services, bus operator on the Central Coast, Australia

See also
AEC Routemaster, a front-engined double-decker bus that was designed by London Transport.
New Routemaster, a hybrid diesel-electric double-decker bus inspired by the AEC Routemaster and operated in London.